Year 490 (CDXC) was a common year starting on Monday (link will display the full calendar) of the Julian calendar. At the time, it was known as the Year of the Consulship of Faustus and Longinus (or, less frequently, year 1243 Ab urbe condita). The denomination 490 for this year has been used since the early medieval period, when the Anno Domini calendar era became the prevalent method in Europe for naming years.

Events 
 By place 
 Europe 
 Spring – Odoacer receives reinforcements from the south and leaves Ravenna. He defeats the Ostrogoths near Faenza. 
 King Theodoric the Great retreats to Ticinum (modern  Pavia), where he constructs a fortified camp, which is blockaded.
 Summer – The Burgundians, under King Gundobad, cross the Alps and plunder Liguria. Many Romans are taken into captivity. 
 King Alaric II supports Theodoric in his conquest of Italy, by dispatching a Visigoth army to raise Odoacer's siege of Pavia.
 August 11 – Battle of Adda: Theodoric and his ally Alaric II defeat the forces of Odoacer, on the Adda River, near Milan. 
 Theodoric and his Ostrogoths lay siege to Ravenna. The cities of Cesena and Rimini retain their allegiance to Odoacer.

 Asia 
 Empress Feng of the Chinese Northern Wei Dynasty dies. She is buried with magnificent honors, in the Wenming Tomb.

 By topic 
 Religion 
 Euphemius becomes patriarch of Constantinople.

Births 
 May 3 – K'an Joy Chitam I, ruler of Palenque (d. 565)
 John Philoponus, Aristotelian commentator and philosopher (d. 570)
 Romanos the Melodist, Syrian poet (approximate date)
 Vigilantia, Byzantine princess (approximate date)

Deaths 
 Feng, Chinese empress and regent of Northern Wei (b. 442)
 Peter III Mongus, patriarch of Alexandria 
 Theodora of Alexandria, Desert Mother

References